"Close Enough for Love" was the theme song from the 1979 film Agatha starring Dustin Hoffman and Vanessa Redgrave. The song has since become a jazz standard. It was composed by Johnny Mandel with lyrics by Paul Williams.

It was the title song on albums by Peggy Lee in 1979 and Andy Williams in 1986. Other notable recordings of the song are by Tony Bennett, Monty Alexander, Lena Horne, Shirley Horn, Dianne Reeves and Marian McPartland.

See also
List of jazz standards

References

1979 songs
1970s jazz standards
Andy Williams songs
Songs with music by Johnny Mandel
Songs written by Paul Williams (songwriter)
Songs written for films